Molybdopterin molybdotransferase (MoeA, Cnx1) is an enzyme with systematic name adenylyl-molybdopterin:molybdate molybdate transferase (AMP-forming). This enzyme catalyses the following chemical reaction

 adenylyl-molybdopterin + molybdate  molybdenum cofactor + AMP

Catalyses the insertion of molybdenum into the ene-dithiol group of molybdopterin.

References

External links 
 

EC 2.10.1